Complete results for Women's Downhill competition at the 2011 World Championships, held on February 13. The fifth race of the championships, 36 athletes from 16 countries competed.

Results 
The race started at 11:00 local time (UTC+1)

References

Downhill, women's
2011 in German women's sport
FIS